Bad Benson is a 1974 studio album by American guitarist George Benson, released on CTI Records.

Track listing
 "Take Five" (Paul Desmond) - 7:08
 "Summer Wishes, Winter Dreams" (Alan Bergman, Marilyn Bergman, Johnny Mandel) - 2:56
 "My Latin Brother" (George Benson) - 6:50
 "No Sooner Said Than Done" (Phil Upchurch) - 5:59
 "Full Compass" (Upchurch) - 5:40
 "The Changing World" (Benson, Art Gore) - 4:53
 "Take the 'A' Train" (Billy Strayhorn) - 4:13 Bonus track on CD reissue
 "Serbian Blue" (Don Sebesky) - 13:03 Bonus track on CD reissue
 "From Now On" (Benson) - 2:20 Bonus track on CD reissue
 Recorded at Van Gelder Studio, Englewood Cliffs, New Jersey on April 22 (Track 9), May 29 (Tracks 1, 3 & 5), May 30 (Tracks 4, 6–8) and June 20 (Track 2), 1974.

Personnel
 George Benson – guitar
 Phil Upchurch – guitar, percussion (3), electric bass (5)
 Kenny Barron – piano
 Ron Carter – bass
 Steve Gadd – drums
 Garnett Brown, Warren Covington, Wayne Andre – trombone
 Paul Faulise – bass trombone
 Alan Rubin, Joe Shepley, John Frosk – trumpet
 Phil Bodner – English horn, clarinet, alto flute
 George Marge – English horn, flute, piccolo flute
 Ray Beckenstein - flute
 Albert Regni - flute, clarinet
 Brooks Tillotson, Jim Buffington – French horn
 Margaret Ross – harp
 Alan Shulman, Charles McCracken, Frank Levy, Jesse Levy, Paul Tobias, Seymour Barab – cello
 Don Sebesky – arrangements and conductor

Production
 Creed Taylor – producer 
 Rudy Van Gelder – engineer, mastering (4-6)
 Bob Ciano – album's design 
 Ben Rose – cover photography 
 Pete Turner – liner photography

References

1974 albums
George Benson albums
Albums arranged by Don Sebesky
Albums produced by Creed Taylor
CTI Records albums
Albums recorded at Van Gelder Studio